The Poacher's Foster Daughter or Noble Millionaire is a Czech comedy film directed by Martin Frič. It was released in 1949.

Cast
 Hana Vítová as Elén Hadrbolcová/Young Bětuška Hadrbolcová
 Oldřich Nový as Millionaire René Skalský
 Ella Nollová as Bětuška Hadrbolcová, Elén's mother
 Otomar Korbelář as Poacher Jan Dubský, Elénin stepfather
 Theodor Pištěk as Factory owner Richard Skalský
 Zdeněk Dítě as Violinist Pavel Sedloň
 Bohumil Machník as Valet Bolton
 Vítězslav Vejražka as Malhorn, director of a theatre agency
 Arnold Flögl as Actor Jan Balada, Elén's father
 František Paul as MUDr. Lexa Otok
 Marie Blažková as Anita Nováková
 Eman Fiala as Voice teacher Leonardo Bianchini
 Jan W. Speerger as Burglar Joe Pelíšek
 Jarmila Smejkalová as Klára
 Irena Bernátová as Zuzana Hromasová

References

External links
 

1949 films
1949 comedy films
1940s Czech-language films
Czechoslovak black-and-white films
Films directed by Martin Frič
Czechoslovak comedy films
1940s Czech films
Czech parody films